Dorthe Hansen is a Danish orienteering competitor. She received a bronze medal in the relay event at the 1983 World Orienteering Championships in Zalaegerszeg, together with Mette Filskov, Hanne Birke and Karin Jexner, and finished 13th in the individual event.

See also
 List of orienteers
 List of orienteering events

References

Year of birth missing (living people)
Living people
Danish orienteers
Female orienteers
Foot orienteers
World Orienteering Championships medalists